Busanjin Station is a station of the Busan Metro Line 1 in Sujeong-dong, Dong District, Busan, South Korea. The station is unrelated to the Busanjin Station of Korail.

References

External links
 Cyber station information from Busan Transportation Corporation

Railway stations in Busan
Busan Metro stations
Dong District, Busan
Railway stations opened in 1987